Iamus is a figure in Greek mythology.

Iamus may also refer to:

Iamus (computer), a computer created by University of Malaga
Iamus (album), a 2012 album composed by the Iamus computer